Mihăescu is a Romanian surname that may refer to:
 Eugen Mihăescu (born 1937), Romanian painter and politician
 Gib Mihăescu (1894–1935), Romanian prose writer and playwright
 Iulian Mihăescu (born 1962), Romanian footballer
 Mădălin Mihăescu (born 1988), Romanian footballer
  (1907–1985), Romanian philologist
  (born 1943), Romanian artist

Romanian-language surnames
Patronymic surnames
Surnames from given names